Police Major General Supanat Ariyamongkol, previously named Panus (born 6 January 1946) is a Thai sprinter and coach. He competed in the men's 4 × 100 metres relay at the 1972 Summer Olympics, and is head coach of the Thai national athletics team and Deputy Secretary-General of the Athletic Association of Thailand. He is the younger twin brother of Surapong Ariyamongkol.

References

External links
 

1946 births
Living people
Athletes (track and field) at the 1972 Summer Olympics
Supanat Ariyamongkol
Supanat Ariyamongkol
Place of birth missing (living people)
Twin sportspeople
Asian Games medalists in athletics (track and field)
Supanat Ariyamongkol
Athletes (track and field) at the 1970 Asian Games
Medalists at the 1970 Asian Games
Supanat Ariyamongkol
Supanat Ariyamongkol